Freedom from fear is one of the Four Freedoms described by U.S. president Franklin D. Roosevelt.

Freedom from fear may also refer to:

Freedom from Fear (Aung San Suu Kyi), 1991 book by Aung San Suu Kyi
Freedom from Fear (Kennedy book), 1999 book by David M. Kennedy
Freedom from Fear (painting), by Norman Rockwell